Polly Shang-Kuan Ling-Feng (born October 10, 1949) is a Taiwanese actress and martial artist who has been active in Hong Kong cinema.

Filmography

 Top Fighter 2 (1996)	
 Super Dragon (1982)
 Heroine of Tribulation (1981)
 Green Dragon Inn (1979)
 Heroes in the Late Ming Dynasty (1979)
 Immortal Warriors (1979)
 Red Phoenix (1979)
 Bruce Li's Magnum Fist (1978)
 The Eighteen Jade Arhats (1978)
 Five Elements of Kung Fu (1978)
 The Last Battle of Yang Chao (1978)
 Little Hero (1978)
 Lung Wei Village (1978)
 Return of the Kung Fu Dragon (1978)
 The Shaolin Kids (1978)
 Zodiac Fighters (1978)
 Bruce, Kung Fu Girls (1977)
 Chin Sha Yen (1977)
 Fight for Survival (1977)
 The Mysterious Heroes (1977)
 Secret of Kowloon Town (1977)
 Shaolin Death Squads (1977)
 Shaolin Traitor (1977)
 Tigresses (1977)
 18 Bronzemen (1976)
 General Stone (1976)
 Hand of Death (1976)
 Heroine Kan Lien Chu (1976)
 Invincible Super Guy (1976)
 Return of The 18 Bronzemen (1976)
 The Traitorous (1976)
 Bons Baisers de Hong-Kong (1975)
 Chinese Amazons (1975)
 The Crazy Guy (1975)
 Heroes Behind the Enemy Lines (1975)
 Heroine (1975)
 Chinatown Capers (1974)
 Empress Dowager's Agate Vase (1974)
 The Rangers (1974)
 The Venturer (1974)
 Back Alley Princess (1973)
 A Gathering of Heroes (1973)
 A Girl Called Tigress (1973)
 Seven To One (1973)
 The Ghostly Face (1972)
 A Girl Fighter (1972)
 The Brave And The Evil (1971)
 The Ghost Hill (1971)
 Morale And Evil (1971)
 Rider of Revenge (1971)
 The Bravest Revenge (1970)
 The Grand Passion (1970)
 Swordsman of All Swordsmen (1968)
 Dragon Gate Inn (1967)

Awards
She received the 1973 (11th) Golden Horse Award for Best Leading Actress for the film Back Alley Princess aka. A Heroic Fight.

References

External links

 Polly Shang-Kuan Ling-Feng at Hong Kong Cinemagic

20th-century Taiwanese actresses
1949 births
Living people